Watkin Tudor Jones (born 26 September 1974), better known by his stage names Ninja and Max Normal, is a South African rapper, songwriter, record producer, performance artist, and director. Jones found international success as a member of Die Antwoord, with Yolandi Visser. He was formerly a member of Max Normal and The Constructus Corporation.

Jones also has had a number of acting roles, including a self-styled role as Ninja in the 2015 Neill Blomkamp film Chappie.

Early life 
Jones was born in Johannesburg, South Africa in 1974.

He frequented nightclubs where he would develop his skills as a rapper. He attended Parktown Boys High where he would meet his Original Evergreen band members.

Career

1993–1999: The Original Evergreen 
Jones was part of the South African rap band The Original Evergreen, which was signed to Sony Music. He released one single with the group, "Puff the Magik," which was banned from radio for its controversial lyrics about marijuana usage. In 1996, after the track would later win a SAMA music award for Best Rap Album award, he left to release a solo album under Chameleon Records and later form Max Normal. The band released Burn the Evidence in 1997, which caused more notoriety in the South African music scene. In 1998, the band resurfaced in Cape Town with a new lineup featuring Brendon le Roux (Vox), Sebastian Voigt (bass, programming), Richard Bruyns (guitar), Stephen Trollip (saxophone), Phat Jack (turntables), Tasha Baxter (vocals) and Sven Mc Alpine (drums), and played extensively in Cape Town and Johannesburg while working on a new album titled "Addictive Personalities," produced by Warrick Sony (Kalahari Surfers) and featuring a guest appearance by Arno Carstens (Springbok Nude Girls). The album was to be released on the Sheer Sound label. Still, it caused such uproar in the South African press due to the contents of its lyrics that Sheer Sound was forced to withdraw it and was the final chapter in The Original Evergreen story as it resulted in the band splitting up. The album "Addictive Personalities" was released in a limited run by Melt 2000 in 1999.

2001–2002: Memoirs Of A Clone and Max Normal 
In 2001, Jones released his debut solo album Memoirs Of A Clone.

At the time, he was the lead vocalist of Max Normal, a hip hop act, which released their debut album entitled Songs From The Mall in 2001, which he disbanded in 2002. Their last gig was played with Faithless on the group's 2002 South Africa tour.

2002–2003: The Constructus Corporation 

When Jones disbanded Max Normal in early 2002, he and musician Sibot invited Markus Wormstorm and Felix Laband to collaborate on The Constructus Corporation project, which resulted in the concept album and graphic novel The Ziggurat, released on 3 June 2002.

Jones asked Anri du Toit, better known as his Die Antwoord bandmate Yolandi Visser to lend vocals for the project. She was credited as Anica the Snuffling.

The Constructus Corporation disbanded in 2003.

2005: The Fantastic Kill 
In 2005, Jones released his second solo album The Fantastic Kill. It was released in France in 2007 as MC Totally Rad And DJ Fuck Are Fucknrad under the name Fucknrad.

2007–2008: MaxNormal.TV 

In 2007, Jones resurrected and revamped Max Normal as the 'corporate' hip-hop group "MaxNormal.TV."

The new lineup consisted of Watkin Tudor Jones revising as Max Normal, and Anri du Toit as Yolandi Visser. The band also featured Neon Don playing various recurring characters and Justin De Nobrega making instrumentals.

The group released its debut and only album Good Morning South Africa in 2008. A DVD featuring 13 skits, music videos and short films was released in the same year, titled Goeie More Zuid Afrika.

2008–current: Die Antwoord 

Jones is currently a member of the South African rap-rave group Die Antwoord. The group was formed by Jones as Ninja, Anri du Toit as ¥o-Landi Vi$$er, and producer Justin De Nobrega as HITEK5000 (formerly referred to as DJ Hi-Tek and God). They have since added a second producer Lil2Hood. Die Antwoord is part of the South African counterculture movement known as Zef.

The band released its debut album $O$ in 2009. It was made freely available online and attracted international attention for their music video "Enter the Ninja". They briefly signed with Interscope Records, and left after pressure from the label to be more generic. du Toit explained that Interscope "kept pushing us to be more generic" to make more money: "If you try to make songs that other people like, your band will always be shit. You always gotta do what you like. If it connects, it's a miracle, but it happened with Die Antwoord.". They formed their own independent label, Zef Recordz and released their second album Ten$ion through it.

They have since released 3 other albums; Donker Mag in 2014, Mount Ninji and da Nice Time Kid in 2016, and "The House of Zef" in 2020. As well as this, Jones played a self-styled role as Ninja in the 2015 Neill Blomkamp film Chappie.

Controversies
In March 2019, Australian musician Zheani Sparkes released a diss track titled "The Question" detailing an alleged sexual assault on her by Jones in South Africa in 2013. Sparkes claimed that Jones drugged her, as well as human traffick[ed] her to Africa, and sent sexually explicit photos of her to cast members of Chappie. She claims that he also expressed having an active interest in her because of her resemblance to his now teenage daughter, Sixteen Jones, who in 2013 was only eight years old. The music video for the track features Sparkes rapping on a rooftop accompanied by screenshots of texting threads, handwritten notes, and photographs from Jones, which she claims, supports the allegations and connections to Die Antwoord.

A conflict between Die Antwoord and Sparkes ensued on social media afterward, where Jones accused Sparkes of catfishing him. In September 2019, Sparkes filed a police report in Queensland, Australia, formalizing her accusations of sexual assault and revenge porn.

Italian-American singer Dionna Dal Monte also accused Jones of sexual assault, which she claimed occurred at a Die Antwoord show in 2014.

In 2019, a video from 2012 surfaced, showing Jones and Die Antwoord bandmate Yolandi Visser fighting Hercules and Love Affair founder Andy Butler while calling him insults, such as "faggot". Butler openly identifies as gay. After fighting him, Visser and Jones alert security staff, and, while crying, Visser claims she was sexually assaulted by Butler. Later on in the video, Jones tells her that her performance was "Oscar-winning."

Jones responded on Facebook, claiming that the person who filmed the video edited it to make it seem like he and Visser were in the wrong. He mentions that Butler harassed them in the days leading up to the fight and that it had nothing to do with his being gay. Jones also claimed that he told Visser to act as "dramatic as possible" about what Butler did to avoid getting detained by security after the fight.

Due to this, Die Antwoord was dropped from the lineup of several upcoming festivals.

In April 2022, adopted son Tokkie (born Gabriel du Preez) accused Du Toit and Jones of physical and sexual abuse against himself and his younger sister Meisie for years.

City Press / News24 reported that six of the cast and crew of Neill Blomkamp's 2015 Hollywood blockbuster, Chappie, confirmed under the condition of anonymity that first-time actor Watkin Jones had "made life on set hell during filming."

In June 2022, American rapper Danny Brown accused Jones of attempted sexual assault against him during an afterparty.

Personal life 
Jones' father died in Johannesburg from a fatal shooting during a hijacking in 2000.

Jones has a daughter, Sixteen Jones, born in 2005 from a previous relationship with Die Antwoord bandmate Yolandi Visser. He also has 3 adopted children. Tokkie and his sister Meisie were adopted in 2010, and Jemile was adopted in 2015.

Jones lives in Cape Town.

Discography

The Original Evergreen 

 Puff The Magik (1995)
Burn The Evidence (1997)
Addictive Personalities (1999)

Max Normal 

 Songs From the Mall (2001)

The Constructus Corporation 

 The Ziggurat (2003)

MaxNormal.TV 

 Rap Made Easy (2007)
 Good Morning South Africa (2008)

Die Antwoord 

 $O$ (2009)
 TEN$ION (2012)
 Donker Mag (2014)
 Mount Ninji and Da Nice Time Kid (2016)
 The House of Zef (2020)
 TBA (2022–2023)

Solo 

 Memoirs of a Clone (2001)
 The Fantastic Kill (2005) (released in 2007 in France as MC Totally Rad And DJ Fuck are Fucknrad)

Filmography 

 Goeie More Zuid Africa DVD (2008)
 Tokoloshe (2011)
 Umshimi Wam (2011)
 Chappie (2015) – features "Baby's On Fire", "Ugly Boy", "Cookie Thumper" and "Enter the Ninja".

References

External links

 
 Watkin Tudor Jones Discography at discogs.com

1974 births
Afrikaans-language singers
Alternative hip hop musicians
Cape Town culture
South African dance musicians
South African hip hop musicians
South African rappers
Living people
White South African people
Die Antwoord members
Alumni of Parktown Boys' High School
People from Johannesburg